Computer humour, also known as hacker humour, is humour on the subject of computers or their users.

Examples
Examples of computer humour include:
"Any key", taken to mean pressing the (non-existent) "Any" key rather than any key
April Fools' Day Request for Comments
Bastard Operator From Hell, a fictional rogue computer operator 
Blinkenlights, a neologism for diagnostic lights 
Bogosort, a portmanteau of the words bogus and sort
COMEFROM, an obscure programming language control flow structure, originally as a joke
"The Complexity of Songs", a journal article published by computer scientist Donald Knuth in 1977 as an in-joke about computational complexity theory
The Computer Contradictionary, a non-fiction book by Stan Kelly-Bootle that compiles a satirical list of definitions of computer industry terms
The Daily WTF, a humorous blog dedicated to "Curious Perversions in Information Technology"
Dilbert, an American comic strip
Easter egg, an intentional inside joke, hidden message or image, or secret feature of a work
List of Google Easter eggs
List of Easter eggs in Microsoft products
The Book of Mozilla
Elephant in Cairo, in computer programming, a piece of data inserted at the end of a search space, which matches the search criteria, in order to make sure the search algorithm terminates; it is a humorous example of a sentinel value
Evil bit, a fictional IPv4 packet header field
Eyeball search, humorous terminology
FINO (first in, never out) (sometimes seen as "FISH", for first in, still here), a humorous scheduling algorithm, as opposed to traditional first in, first out (FIFO) and last in, first out (LIFO)
Garbage in, garbage out (GIGO), the concept that flawed, or nonsense input data produces nonsense output
J. Random Hacker, an arbitrary programmer (hacker)
Halt and Catch Fire (HCF), an idiom referring to a computer machine code instruction that causes the computer's CPU to cease meaningful operation
Hex, a fictional computer featured in the Discworld novels by Terry Pratchett
Hexspeak, like leetspeak, a novelty form of spelling using the hexadecimal digits
Hyper Text Coffee Pot Control Protocol (HTCPCP), a facetious communication protocol for controlling, monitoring, and diagnosing coffee pots
Interactive EasyFlow, a diagramming and flow charting software package that included a humorous software licence This is where the bloodthirsty licensing agreement is supposed to go...
Internet Oracle, an effort at collective humor in a pseudo-Socratic question-and-answer format
IP over Avian Carriers, a joke proposal to carry IP traffic by birds such as homing pigeons
It's Geek 2 Me, a tech cartoon 
Jargon File, a glossary and usage dictionary of slang used by computer programmers
The Joy of Tech, a webcomic 
Kitchen Table International, a fictitious computer company 
Kremvax, originally a fictitious Usenet site at the Kremlin, named like the then large number of Usenet VAXen with names of the form foovax
lp0 on fire (also known as Printer on Fire), is an outdated error message generated on some Unix and Unix-like computer operating systems in response to certain types of printer errors
Magic smoke (also factory smoke, blue smoke, angry pixies, or the genie), a humorous name for the caustic smoke produced by burning out electronic circuits or components
Ninety–ninety rule: "the first 90% of the code accounts for the first 90% of the development time. The remaining 10% of the code accounts for the other 90% of the development time"
Null device, in programmer jargon, the bit bucket or black hole
PC LOAD LETTER or PC LOAD A4, a printer error message that has entered popular culture as a technology meme referring to a confusing or inappropriate error message
Slowsort, a humorous, not useful, sorting algorithm
The Tao of Programming, a 1987 book by Geoffrey James
TPS report, Testing Procedure Specification, has come to mean pointless, mindless paperwork
User error, an error made by the human user of a complex system. Related slang terms include PMAC ("problem exists between monitor and chair"), identity error or ID-10T/1D-10T error ("idiot error"), PICNIC ("problem in chair, not in computer"), IBM error ("idiot behind machine error")
User Friendly, a former daily webcomic
Working Daze, a comic strip
Write-only memory (joke)
xkcd, a webcomic
Zaltair, a fictional computer created by Steve Wozniak

See also
Computational humor, a branch of computational linguistics and artificial intelligence which uses computers in humor research
Humor on the internet
Mathematical joke
Geek
Esoteric programming language
List of humorous units of measurement

 
Computing-related lists